Pithart is a Czech surname. Notable people with the surname include:

 František Pithart (1915–2003), Czech chess player
 Petr Pithart (born 1941), Czech politician, lawyer, and political scientist

Czech-language surnames